Vladigerov Passage (‘Vladigerov Protok’ \vla-di-'ge-rov 'pro-tok\) is the passage long 5.8 km in southwest-northeast direction and 1.05 km wide in Biscoe Islands, Antarctica between Lavoisier Island on the east and Krogh Island on the west.

The passage is named after the Bulgarian composer Pancho Vladigerov (1899-1978).

Location
British mapping in 1976.

Maps
 British Antarctic Territory.  Scale 1:200000 topographic map.  DOS 610 Series, Sheet W 66 66.  Directorate of Overseas Surveys, UK, 1976.
 Antarctic Digital Database (ADD). Scale 1:250000 topographic map of Antarctica. Scientific Committee on Antarctic Research (SCAR). Since 1993, regularly upgraded and updated.

References
 Bulgarian Antarctic Gazetteer. Antarctic Place-names Commission. (details in Bulgarian, basic data in English)
 Vladigerov Passage. SCAR Composite Antarctic Gazetteer.

External links
 Vladigerov Passage. Copernix satellite image

Straits of the Biscoe Islands
Bulgaria and the Antarctic